The canton of Montereau-Fault-Yonne is a French administrative division, located in the arrondissement of Provins, in the Seine-et-Marne département (Île-de-France région). Its population was 69,165 in 2019.

Composition 
At the French canton reorganisation which came into effect in March 2015, the canton was expanded from 14 to 25 communes (of which 5 merged into the new commune Moret-Loing-et-Orvanne):

Barbey
La Brosse-Montceaux
Cannes-Écluse
Champagne-sur-Seine
Courcelles-en-Bassée
Esmans
Forges
La Grande-Paroisse
Laval-en-Brie
Marolles-sur-Seine
Misy-sur-Yonne
Montereau-Fault-Yonne
Moret-Loing-et-Orvanne
Saint-Germain-Laval
Saint-Mammès
Salins
Thomery
Varennes-sur-Seine  
Vernou-la-Celle-sur-Seine
Villecerf
Ville-Saint-Jacques

See also
Cantons of the Seine-et-Marne department
Communes of the Seine-et-Marne department

References

Montereau Fault Yonne